Edward Smith (c. 1704 – 15 February 1762) was an English Tory politician who sat in the British House of Commons from 1734 to 1762.

Smith was the eldest son of Rev. Roger Smith of Bosworth and his wife Judith Tomlinson. He was educated at Melton Mowbray and at Rugby School. He matriculated at Magdalene College, Cambridge.

Smith  was Member of Parliament (MP) for Leicestershire from 1734 until his death in 1762. He was unopposed in 1754 and 1761 when he was classed as a Tory.

Smith married Margaret Horsman, daughter of Edward Horsman of Stretton, Rutland. He lived at Edmondthorpe.

References 

1700s births
1762 deaths
Members of the Parliament of Great Britain for Leicestershire
British MPs 1734–1741
British MPs 1741–1747
British MPs 1747–1754
British MPs 1754–1761
British MPs 1761–1768
People educated at Rugby School
Alumni of Magdalene College, Cambridge
Tory MPs (pre-1834)